Money Hai Toh Honey Hai is a Bollywood comedy film directed by Ganesh Acharya and produced by Kumar Mangat, story and screenplay by Muazzam Beg. It features a cast of stars including Govinda, Aftab Shivdasani, Upen Patel, Hansika Motwani, Celina Jaitly and Manoj Bajpayee in the lead roles with Ravi Kishan, Antara Biswas and Prem Chopra in supporting roles. Esha Deol and the director of the film Ganesh Acharya make special appearances.

Plot
Money Hai Toh Honey Hai is a comedy that deals with the lives of six individuals. Bobby Arora (Govinda) is a happy-go-lucky guy who runs away from home to prove himself as a can-do child. Lallabhai (Manoj Bajpayee) becomes wealthy after his lottery win of 1 crore rupees, but he goes back on the streets after his business fails and he loses all his money. Gaurav (Aftab Shivdasani) is a copy writer who is fired from his job. Manik (Upen Patel), is a struggling model who sleeps with a middle-age fashion designer, Dolly (Archana Puran Singh), and hopes to make it big. Ashima Kapoor (Hansika Motwani) is a successful TV star, but she’s not happy with her career and is desperate to star in films. Shruti (Celina Jaitly) is a struggling dress designer.

One day, they all get an SMS informing them that they are the owners of Shahenshah Jaiswal's (Prem Chopra) 1000-crore company. However, their happiness does not last long, for their lawyer reveals that there’s a loan of 1200 crore on the company and they must repay it. Until the loan is repaid, they will be kept under house arrest. So, using the extra cloth left from a failed shipment to Korea, they make garments.((unclear)) But not just any, the type they make is enough for an ordinary person to buy. They display that in a fashion show, getting ordinary people from the street. At the end, they succeed and keep on making more stores for other parts of India with the help of the bank. The movie ends with Bobby and Ashima getting married.

Cast
 Govinda as Bobby Arora
 Aftab Shivdasani as Gaurav Negi
 Hansika Motwani as Ashima Kapoor / Meera
 Celina Jaitly as Shruti Badola
 Manoj Bajpayee as Lallabhai Bharodia
 Ravi Kishan as Parag Batra
 Antara Biswas as Manish Sarraf’s Wife
 Upen Patel as Manikchand 'Manik' Khiralal
 Prem Chopra as Krishnakumar / Shehenshah Jaiswal
 Archana Puran Singh as Dolly
 Kim Sharma as Sara Das
 Priyanka Sharma as Anjali Sukhani
 Javaid Sheikh as Prakash Arora, Bobby's father
 Ketki Dave as Aarti Arora, Bobby's Mother
 Kurush Deboo as Production Supervisor
 Shruti Sharma as Sakkubai
 Paresh Ganatra as Chaman Patel 
 Viju Khote as Jaiswal's Doctor
 Rakhee Tandon as Mukti Kapoor (Ashima's boss)
 Nitin Arora as Bhola Plumber
 Esha Deol (Special appearance in song Ta Na Na)
 Ganesh Acharya (Special appearance in song Chhuriyaan)
 Om Puri as the Narrator
 Vicky Sidana as Ravan
 Sumit Arora as Traffic Constable
 Raju Mavani as Mr.Wadhwa
 Snehal Sahay

Music
The album has eight tracks including one instrumental, composed by Nitz 'N' Sony (Nitin Arora and Sony Chandy).

Track listings

Reception

Critical reception
Rajeev Masand of CNN-IBN rated it 2/5: "Sorely lacking in drama and genuine humour, Money Hai Toh Honey is mind-numbingly dull because there’s no conflict or plot progression, and everything seems to fall into place too conveniently, which even ruins the amazing comedy at the first half!"

Mayank Shekhar of Hindustan Times rated it 2.5/5: "Scenes may well be dull and weak in parts. And they are. But for a comedy film, it needs to have some more sense-of-humor".

Raja Sen of Rediff rated it 1.5/5: "This is, first and foremost, a tacky film. The tastelessness flowing right down into the script, however, makes for a very different league of disaster."

Taran Adarsh of Bollywood Hungama rated it 2/5: "Money Hai Toh Honey Hai is a poor show. Watch the first half and laugh your total head-off, but at the second half, try to enjoy a damp squib!"

Nikhat Kazmi of The Times of India gave it the highest rating it got: 3.5/5: "Money Hai Toh Honey made a complete laugh-riot in the first part, but soon after the interval a lot of drama and romance jumps in which is totally something you don't need in a comedy movie, it needed a much smarter script to keep the laughter ringing".

References

External links
 

2000s Hindi-language films
2008 films
Indian comedy films
2008 comedy films
Films directed by Ganesh Acharya